Viola labradorica, commonly known as alpine violet, American dog violet, dog violet or Labrador violet, is a perennial herbaceous flowering plant. It is native to Greenland, eastern Canada, and the eastern United States. The plant sold as Viola labradorica by nurseries is Viola riviniana.

Uses

Culinary
Viola labradorica has edible leaves and flowers. The leaves are sometimes characterized as "wooly" and thus not as desirable for eating.

See also
List of Viola species

References

External links

labradorica
Plants described in 1818
Alpine flora
Flora of Eastern Canada
Flora of Subarctic America
Flora of the North-Central United States
Flora of the Northeastern United States
Flora of the Northwestern United States
Flora of the Southeastern United States
Flora of Western Canada
Edible plants
Garden plants of North America
Groundcovers
Flora without expected TNC conservation status